Barry Daly (born 19 September 1992) is a retired rugby union player who last played for Leinster. He also played for UCD in the All Ireland League. Daly was awarded his first fully professional contract ahead of the 2016–17 season.

Daly also played rugby sevens. He was a member of the Ireland national rugby sevens team that unsuccessfully attempted to qualify as one of the twelve teams for the rugby sevens at the 2016 Summer Olympics in Rio, Brazil.

Daly was educated in Gonzaga College where he was famous for his hand offs.

Leinster Rugby
In the 2017/2018 Season, Daly came off the bench vs. the Cardiff Blues to score his first try of the season. Following up on this, Daly scored a hat-trick against Toyota Cheetahs in what was a losing effort. Daly made his European debut against , scoring the 4th try for Leinster, and securing a bonus point win. Daly was tipped for a call up to the Ireland squad, before injuring his ankle against Glasgow Warriors, leaving him on the sidelines for a minimum of 6 weeks.

Daly made his return from injury in the St. Stephens Day win against Munster, offloading to Robbie Henshaw to assist the second try of the game. On 6 January 2018, Daly scored his 6th try of the season in a win against Ulster. On 23 February, Daly continued his impressive try scoring season with Leinster, with two more tries against the Southern Kings in the RDS. On 5 March, Daly was called up to the extended Ireland squad for the Six Nations Matches against Scotland and England. Daly finished the 2017/2018 season as the Pro14 top try scorer with 12 tries, and Leinster's overall top try scorer with 13 tries.

Injuries and retirement
After injuring his knee on the opening day of the 2018/2019 season, Daly returned to action in the win against Ulster. Daly followed up with two tries in two games against the Scarlets and Southern Kings.

In summer 2020, during the sporting hiatus due to the COVID-19 pandemic, Daly retired from professional rugby following two years during which he was sidelined by significant knee problems. Following retirement Daly enrolled in Boston College to pursue a master's degree in business.

References

External links
 Leinster Profile
Pro14 Profile

1992 births
Living people
Rugby union players from Dublin (city)
Irish rugby union players
Rugby union wings
Leinster Rugby players
University College Dublin R.F.C. players
Ireland international rugby sevens players